Melhania didyma is a plant in the mallow family Malvaceae, native to southern Africa.

Description
It branches from near the base, with a woody main stem. The species resembles Melhania forbesii in the bracts of the epicalyx, but differs in upper leaf surface.

Distribution and habitat
Melhania didyma is native to Botswana, South Africa (Cape Provinces, KwaZulu-Natal, Northern Provinces) and Eswatini. Its habitat includes thornveld, grassy slopes or forest margins. The species is often found by rivers.

References

didyma
Flora of Southern Africa
Plants described in 1835